Late Labs is a San Francisco based “crowdcoding” startup founded by Justin Johnson and Nathan Ross. The website aims to connect people with ideas (hustlers) with developers (hackers) who are compensated for their coding with equity.

Background
Late Labs was founded in 2012 to connect ideas with the resources to make them a reality. The startup features a list of projects open for contribution. The projects are aimed for developers to find worthwhile sides projects and gain equity for reward in an eventual exit. The website had over 3,500 developers sign-up in its first month after launch.

The startup's first project is called “Buggle Us” and is planned to be a Google Chrome extension for simple file sharing and editing.

Late Labs has been featured in TechCrunch, VentureBeat, Tech Cocktail, Pando Daily, and others.

References

External links
  Late Labs
 Late Labs on Twitter

Companies based in San Francisco
Crowdsourcing